Raorchestes crustai is a species of frog of the genus Raorchestes found in Bonacaud in the Western Ghats of Kerala in India.

References

External links
 

crustai
Frogs of India
Endemic fauna of the Western Ghats
Amphibians described in 2011